Grace Victoria Cox (born March 10, 1995) is an American actress. She is known for playing Melanie Cross in the CBS series Under the Dome (2014–2015), Veronica Sawyer in the Paramount Network series Heathers (2018), and Lexie in the Netflix series The Society (2019). She was born to parents Fred Cox and her mother [unknown] She studied writing and moved to Hollywood at 19 to further pursue her acting career

Filmography

References

External links
 

1995 births
21st-century American actresses
Actors from Lexington, Kentucky
Actresses from Kentucky
American film actresses
American television actresses
Living people